Mudiame University, Irrua is a private institution located in Irrua, Edo State, Nigeria.

History 
The university was founded by Professor Sunny Eromosele Eboh, CEO of Mudiame International Limited and Mudiame Welding Institute.

In 2021, Mudiame University was granted license by the Federal Executive Council to commenced academic programmes.

Programmes 
The National University Commission, NUC, have accredited the University programmes. The following courses are currently available for study at university:

Faculty of Social and Management Sciences

 BSc Accounting
BSc Economics
BSc Entrepreneurship

Faculty of Basic Science and Computing

·        BSc Mathematics

·        BSc Computer Engineering

·        BSc Software Engineering

·        BSc Physics with Electronics

·        BSc Chemistry

.BSc Electrical and Electronic Engineering

.BSc Mechanical Engineering

·        BSc Computer Science

Reference 

Education in Edo State
Universities and colleges in Nigeria